Stefano Gioacchini (born 25 November 1976) is an Italian former footballer who played as a forward.

Career
During his career, Gioacchini played for Quayside Warriors, Cosenza, Venezia, Coventry City, Salernitana, and Lodigiani/Cisco Roma, as well as Rieti and Lupa Frascati. At Coventry his only first team appearances came at the end of the 1998–99 season, as he came on as a substitute in 3 Premier League games against Arsenal, Southampton and Leicester City. Throughout his career, he also made 3 appearances in Serie A, and 119 appearances in Serie B, scoring 56 goals.

References

External links
Profile

Living people
1976 births
Association football forwards
Italian footballers
Italian expatriate footballers
Premier League players
A.C. Perugia Calcio players
Cosenza Calcio 1914 players
Venezia F.C. players
Coventry City F.C. players
U.S. Salernitana 1919 players
Expatriate footballers in England
Italian expatriate sportspeople in England